In a Different Key: The Story of Autism is a book by John Donvan and Caren Zucker.  The book covers the history of autism and autism advocacy.  Issues that they discuss include the Refrigerator mother theory and the possibility of an autism epidemic.  One autistic individual they cover in particular is Donald Triplett.  Another point they covered was psychiatrist Leo Kanner.  This book has additionally discussed the debate concerning the neurodiversity movement, especially with respect to low-functioning autistics.

Story 
The book starts by focusing on Donald Triplett, the first recorded child to be diagnosed with autism.  It discusses how he was treated and on his family.  The book then focused on the refrigerator mother theory, which claimed that parents were the main cause of autism.  It examined Leo Kanner and Bruno Bettelheim's role in the formation of this theory, and discussed whether Kanner supported the refrigerator mother theory or not.  The following parts focused on redefining the disorder so that more people with autism could receive treatment and improve their potential.  After that, the beginnings of early modern research of autism were discussed, along with how the disorder should be defined and whether it was a benefit or a deficit.  The final chapters focus on the rise of public knowledge of autism, the MMR vaccine controversy, and the neurodiversity debate.

Reception 
Kirkus Reviews wrote that the book was compelling and well-researched, and the authors blended the search for treatment with the personal stories of various individuals.  Spectrum wrote that the book provided a meticulous, absorbing stepwise chronology of how the perception of autism changed from being unknown to being abhorred, then later accepted.  Ari Ne'eman has criticized the book for sympathizing with a parent who murdered their autistic child, and has claimed that the book misrepresents the neurodiversity movement.

Awards
In a Different Key was a finalist for the 2017 Pulitzer Prize for General Nonfiction, described by the reviewers as "a passionate work of advocacy that traces public perceptions about autism from chillingly cruel beginnings to a kinder but still troubling present."

References

External links
 Official website
 Feature Documentary website

American non-fiction books
Books about autism
Documentary films about autism
2016 non-fiction books
Broadway Books books